Vasja Simčič (born 1 July 1983) is a retired Slovenian football goalkeeper.

Honours
Gorica
Slovenian PrvaLiga: 2003–04, 2004–05, 2005–06

Koper
Slovenian Cup: 2014–15
Slovenian Supercup: 2015

References

External links
PrvaLiga profile 

1983 births
Living people
Slovenian footballers
Association football goalkeepers
ND Gorica players
NK Brda players
FC Koper players
Slovenian PrvaLiga players
Slovenia under-21 international footballers